La Victoria de Chacabuco Airport  is an airport serving Chacabuco Province in the Santiago Metropolitan Region of Chile.

The airport is in a broad valley with distant mountainous terrain in all quadrants. Runway 21 has an additional  displaced threshold.

See also

Transport in Chile
List of airports in Chile

References

External links
OpenStreetMap - La Victoria de Chacabuco Airport
OurAirports - La Victoria de Chacabuco Airport
FallingRain - La Victoria de Chacabuco

Airports in Santiago Metropolitan Region